Oscar Hackett Neil Moss (28 July 1938 – 23 March 1959) was a British student who died in a caving accident. A twenty-year-old undergraduate studying philosophy at Balliol College, Oxford, Moss became jammed underground,  from the entrance, after descending a narrow unexplored shaft in Peak Cavern, a famous cave system in Castleton in Derbyshire, on 22 March 1959. Initial attempts to haul him free failed because the rope broke several times. When he lost consciousness as carbon dioxide from his own respiration built up in the base of the shaft, he was unable to assist further rescue attempts made with a stronger rope. More rescue efforts were made: on the second day eighteen-year-old June Bailey answered the call for an experienced caver small enough to fit into the tunnel, and spent six hours assisting, until she was "driven back by foul air." Caving veteran Bob Leakey also tried, but could not get to Moss. Moss never regained consciousness and was declared dead on the morning of Tuesday, 24 March, after the final rescue attempt had failed.

It was assumed that Moss became stuck after moving a boulder in part of the tunnel, which then trapped the ladder preventing him being pulled up by rescuers. The distance between the rungs of the ladder was too great for someone of his height to reach through the remaining gap.

His father, who had kept vigil at the entrance, requested that his son's body be left in place to avoid risk of further injury or loss of life to those attempting a retrieval. 
 The fissure was sealed with loose rocks from the floor of the chamber and an inscription was later placed nearby. This section of Peak Cavern is now known as Moss Chamber. There were media reports of the fissure being filled with cement but this is untrue, as verified by those who participated in the rescue and clear-up.

The story of Moss's death was widely publicised, including worldwide in European, Australian, and American newspapers. It also featured in the novel One Last Breath (2004) by Stephen Booth. and in a 2006 documentary by fellow Derbyshire caver Dave Webb, available on DVD as Fight For Life – The Neil Moss Story.

See also 

 Caving in the United Kingdom
 List of UK caving fatalities

References

External links
The Neil Moss Tragedy

1938 births
1959 deaths
Accidental deaths in England
Alumni of Balliol College, Oxford
British cavers
Caving incidents and rescues
Deaths by person in England
Deaths from hypercapnia